Ironpot is a rural locality in the South Burnett Region, Queensland, Australia. In the  Ironpot had a population of 45 people.

Geography 
Craig Range, part of the Great Dividing Range, forms the western boundary of the locality. The ranges include two mountains in Ironpot:

The western edge of the locality is within the protected area of the Diamondy State Forest. Apart from the forest, the predominant land use is grazing on native vegetation with a small amount of crop-growing.

History
Ironpot Creek State School opened on 7 February 1916. It closed temporarily in 1926. It closed permanently on 31 December 1974. It was on a  site on the western corner of Ironpot Road and McGills Road.

In the 2011 census, Ironpot had a population of 285.

In the  Ironpot had a population of 45 people.

Heritage listings 
Ironpot has a number of heritage-listed sites, including:
 South Burrandowan Road: Wylarah Homestead

Economy
There are a number of homesteads in the locality, including:

 Bungara
 Fairfield
 Greystonlea
 Hidden Vale
 Jumma
 Kameruka
 Pine View
 Sarum
 Stoneleigh
 Warragai
 Werona
 Wylarah
 Wylora

Education
There are no schools in Ironpot. The nearest primary schools are Kumbia State School in Kumbia to the south-east and Durong South State School in Durong to the north-west. The nearest secondary schools are Kingaroy State High School (to Year 12) in Kingaroy to the east, Bell State School (to Year 10) in Bell to the south, and Jandowae State School (to Year 10) in Jandowae to the south-west.

Amenities
Ironpot Farmers Hall is on Jarail Road. It is used for community functions.

References

External links

South Burnett Region
Localities in Queensland